Richard Warren (died 6 February 1735) was an Irish politician.

Warren served as the Member of Parliament for Kildare Borough in the Irish House of Commons between 1716 and his death in 1735.

References

Year of birth unknown
1735 deaths
Irish MPs 1715–1727
Irish MPs 1727–1760
Members of the Parliament of Ireland (pre-1801) for County Kildare constituencies